Charlton Park may refer to:

Charlton Park, Cheltenham, Gloucestershire, a location in England
Charlton Park, Wiltshire, England, residence of the Earl and Countess of Suffolk
WOMAD Charlton Park, WOMAD festival in Wiltshire, England
Historic Charlton Park, Barry County, Michigan, United States
Charlton Park, Greenwich, a park in south-east London, England
Charlton Park RFC, a rugby club based in south-east London, England